Lori Ann Verderame  (born January 11, 1965), known professionally as Dr. Lori, is an American appraiser of antiques, collectibles, and fine art; she is also a television personality, public speaker, author, professor and museum curator and director. Verderame has been called “America's appraiser" and is "the Ph.D. antiques appraiser". She has been noted for her humorous, conversational, and educational style of appraisal on her road show events.

Verderame has been featured on The Curse of Oak Island, Auction Kings, and Strange Inheritance (where she discovered, authenticated, and appraised George Washington's wallet), and made appearances on The Tonight Show with Jay Leno, The Daily Show with Jon Stewart, The Today Show, Anderson Live, CBS News, and Inside Edition. From 2008 to 2009 she hosted Comcast Tonight. She writes a syndicated column, "Arts & Antiques by Dr. Lori". Her road show events held nationwide are called Dr. Lori's Antiques Appraisal Comedy Show and she appears live on stage at 150 to 200 events every year since 1998. She maintains a popular YouTube channel that teaches people how to identify antiques and make money and spot valuables in thrift stores, yard sales and in attics. The channel content shows clips from her road show and television appearances, and she appraises over 20,000 objects a year.

Early life
Lori Ann Verderame was born in New Haven, Connecticut on January 11, 1965.

Verderame attended Hamden High School in Hamden, Connecticut, graduating in 1983. Verderame graduated from University of Michigan at Ann Arbor, where she received a Bachelor of Arts degree in World History in 1987. She graduated from Wesleyan University, where she received a Master of Arts degree in Liberal Studies degree with a focus on Art History in 1989. From 1988 to 1992, she worked as a museum educator at the Yale University Art Gallery in New Haven, CT. In 1996, she graduated from Pennsylvania State University's College of Arts and Architecture with a Ph.D. doctorate in Art and Architectural History. 

Verderame taught art and architectural history at Pennsylvania State University; she also taught at the State University of New York College at Cortland from 1993 to 1994. She worked as a curator at the Allentown Art Museum in Allentown, Pennsylvania.

Touring and television
Lori Verderame presents "Dr. Lori's Antiques Appraisal Comedy Show" traveling around the United States and overseas appraising objects in an educational and entertaining manner. The show is presented live; audiences bring their objects for appraisal as part of the unscripted comedic appraisal stage show.

Verderame has been featured on The Tonight Show and The Daily Show with Jon Stewart. She has appeared on Anderson Live with Anderson Cooper, Daytime, The Balancing Act on Lifetime, Inside Edition, ABC, CBS, NBC, and FOX. From 2011 to 2013, Verderame was the art and antiques appraiser on Discovery's TV show Auction Kings. She appeared on episodes of FOX Business Network's Strange Inheritance. She is a cast member as the artifacts and antiquities expert on History's The Curse of Oak Island.

Verderame has produced and co-hosted (with Carol Erickson) the series Value This! with Dr. Lori. She hosts and co-produces the weekly series What's It Worth? with Dr. Lori with Steinman Communications and LNP Media Group and is a YouTube content creator. In 2019, she was a cast member and co-host on Treasure Hunt Tuesdays on the national daytime talk show The Doctor and the Diva on the DABL and YouToo America networks.

Works
Verderame authored the following published books:

 Art History's Heroes: Masters of Contemporary Realism (Martin Art Gallery, Allentown, PA 2003)
 A Thin Line—a Broad Brush: The Art of Bruce Johnson (Susquehanna Art Museum, Harrisburg, PA, 2002)
 Seymour Lipton: An American Sculptor (Palmer Museum of Art, Pennsylvania State University, University Park, PA, 2000)
 Seymour Lipton: Post-War America in Three Dimensions (Martin Art Gallery, Allentown, PA, 2001)
 The Founder of Sculpture As Environment: Herbert Ferber (1906–1991) (Picker Art Gallery, Colgate University, Hamilton, NY, 1998)
 Muhlenberg Masterpieces: Selections from the Permanent Collection of Muhlenberg College (Martin Art Gallery, Allentown, PA, 1997)''

References

Sources

External links

1965 births
Writers from New Haven, Connecticut
People from Bucks County, Pennsylvania
Living people
American art historians
Women art historians
University of Michigan College of Literature, Science, and the Arts alumni
Wesleyan University alumni
Penn State College of Arts and Architecture alumni
American women television personalities
American people of Italian descent
American women historians
Historians from Pennsylvania
Historians from Connecticut
21st-century American women
Television personalities from Connecticut
American women curators
American curators
Museum educators